The 2020 United States House of Representatives election in South Dakota was held on November 3, 2020, to elect the U.S. representative from South Dakota's at-large congressional district. The election coincided with the 2020 U.S. presidential election, as well as other elections to the House of Representatives, elections to the United States Senate and various state and local elections.

Incumbent Republican Dusty Johnson was elected with 60.3% of the vote in 2018.

Republican primary

Candidates

Declared
 Dusty Johnson, incumbent U.S. Representative
 Liz Marty May, state representative

Primary results

Democratic primary
No candidate was able to gather enough signatures to qualify for the Democratic primary. According to state party chairman Randy Seiler, Democratic canvassing efforts were hampered by the coronavirus outbreak.

Candidates

Failed to qualify
 Whitney Raver, small business owner
 Brian Worth, financial crime specialist

Withdrawn
 Ellee Spawn, resource coordinator

Endorsements

Libertarian convention

Candidates

Declared
 Randy Luallin, nominee for Colorado's 2nd congressional district in 2012

General election

Predictions

Results

References

External links
 
 
  (State affiliate of the U.S. League of Women Voters)
 

Official campaign websites
 Dusty Johnson (R) for Congress
 Randy Luallin (L) for Congress

South Dakota
2020
House